The Grid Compass (written GRiD by its manufacturer GRiD Systems Corporation) is one of the first laptop computers.

History 
Development began in 1979, and the main buyer was the U.S. government. NASA used it on the Space Shuttle during the early 1980s, as it was powerful, lightweight, and compact. The military Special Forces also purchased the machine, as it could be used by paratroopers in combat.

Along with the Gavilan SC and Sharp PC-5000 released the following year, the GRiD Compass established much of the basic design of subsequent laptop computers, although the laptop concept itself owed much to the Dynabook project developed at Xerox PARC from the late 1960s. The Compass company subsequently earned significant returns on its patent rights as its innovations became commonplace.

Competitors 

The portable Osborne 1 computer sold at around the same time as the GRiD, was more affordable and more popular, and ran the popular CP/M operating system. But, unlike the Compass, the Osborne was not a laptop and lacked the Compass's refinement and small size.

Models 
The Compass ran its own operating system, GRiD-OS. Its specialized software and high price (–) meant that it was limited to specialized applications.

Compass 
The initial model, the 1101, was introduced in April 1982; The 1100 model designation were never released commercially, but featured in some pre-release marketing material. The computer was designed by British industrial designer Bill Moggridge.

Design 

The design used a clamshell case (where the screen folds flat to the rest of the computer when closed), which was made from a magnesium alloy. The computer featured an Intel 8086 processor, a  electroluminescent display, 340-kilobyte magnetic bubble memory, and a  modem. Devices such as hard drives and floppy drives could be connected via the IEEE-488 I/O (also known as GPIB or General Purpose Interface Bus). This port made it possible to connect multiple devices to the addressable device bus. The power input is ~ AC, .

Compass II 

The Compass II was released in 1984; known as 1121, 1129, 1131 and 1139 models.

References

External links 

 
 
 
 InfoWorld Aug 2, 1982
 InfoWorld Nov 8, 1982
 
 
 
 

Early laptops
Products introduced in 1982
Grid Systems laptops